Doyet (Dolhet in Occitan) is a commune in the Allier department in central France. Its inhabitants are called Doyétois.

Geography

Location 
Doyet has seven neighboring towns:

 Bézenet
 Chamblet
 Deneuille-les-Mines
 Malicorne
 Montvicq
 Saint-Angel
 Villefrance-d'Allier

Population

See also
Communes of the Allier department

References

External links
 

Communes of Allier
Allier communes articles needing translation from French Wikipedia